2060 Chiron is a small Solar System body in the outer Solar System, orbiting the Sun between Saturn and Uranus. Discovered in 1977 by Charles Kowal, it was the first-identified member of a new class of objects now known as centaurs—bodies orbiting between the asteroid belt and the Kuiper belt.

Although it was initially called an asteroid and classified only as a minor planet with the designation "2060 Chiron", in 1989 it was found to exhibit behavior typical of a comet. Today it is classified as both a minor planet and a comet, and is accordingly also known by the cometary designation 95P/Chiron. Chiron is named after the centaur Chiron in Greek mythology.

History

Discovery 

Chiron was discovered on 1 November 1977 by Charles Kowal from images taken on 18 October at Palomar Observatory. It was found near aphelion and at the time of discovery it was the most distant known minor planet. Chiron was even claimed as the tenth planet by the press. Chiron was later found on several precovery images, going back to 1895, which allowed its orbit to be accurately determined. It had been at perihelion in 1945 but was not discovered then because there were few searches being made at that time, and these were not sensitive to slow-moving objects. The Lowell Observatory's survey for distant planets would not have gone down faint enough in the 1930s and did not cover the right region of the sky in the 1940s. The April 1895 precovery image was one month after the March 1895 perihelion.

Naming 

This minor planet was named after Chiron, a half-human, half-horse centaur from Greek mythology. Son of the Titan Cronus and the nymph Philyra, Chiron was the wisest and most just of all centaurs, serving as an instructor of the Greek heroes. The official  was published by the Minor Planet Center on 1 April 1978. It was suggested that the names of other centaurs be reserved for objects of the same type.

Chiron, along with most major and minor planetary bodies, is not generally given a symbol in astronomy. A symbol  was devised for it by Al H. Morrison and is mostly used among astrologers: it resembles a key as well as an OK monogram for Object Kowal.

Orbit 

Chiron's orbit was found to be highly eccentric (0.37), with perihelion just inside the orbit of Saturn and aphelion just outside the perihelion of Uranus (it does not reach the average distance of Uranus, however). According to the program Solex, Chiron's closest approach to Saturn in modern times was around May 720, when it came within  million km of Saturn. During this passage Saturn's gravity caused Chiron's semi-major axis to decrease from  AU to 13.7 AU. Chiron's orbit does not intersect Uranus'.

Chiron attracted considerable interest because it was the first object discovered in such an orbit, well outside the asteroid belt. Chiron is classified as a centaur, the first of a class of objects orbiting between the outer planets. Chiron is a Saturn–Uranus object because its perihelion lies in Saturn's zone of control and its aphelion lies in that of Uranus. Centaurs are not in stable orbits and will be removed by gravitational perturbation by the giant planets over a period of millions of years, moving to different orbits or leaving the Solar System altogether. Chiron is probably from the Kuiper belt and will probably become a short-period comet in about a million years. Chiron came to perihelion (closest point to the Sun) in 1996 and aphelion in May 2021.

Physical characteristics

Spectral type 

The visible and near-infrared spectrum of Chiron is neutral, and is similar to that of C-type asteroids and the nucleus of Halley's Comet. The near-infrared spectrum of Chiron shows absence of water ice.

Rotation period 

Four rotational light curves of Chiron were taken from photometric observations between 1989 and 1997. Lightcurve analysis gave a concurring, well-defined rotational period of 5.918 hours with a small brightness variation of 0.05 to 0.09 magnitude, which indicates that the body has a rather spheroidal shape.

Diameter 

The assumed size of an object depends on its absolute magnitude (H) and the albedo (the amount of light it reflects). In 1984 Lebofsky estimated Chiron to be about 180 km in diameter. Estimates in the 1990s were closer to 150 km in diameter. Occultation data from 1993 suggests a diameter of about 180 km. Therefore, Chiron may be as large as 10199 Chariklo. The diameter of Chiron is difficult to estimate in part because the true absolute magnitude of its nucleus is uncertain due to its highly variable cometary activity.

Cometary behavior 

In February 1988, at 12 AU from the Sun, Chiron brightened by 75 percent. This is behavior typical of comets but not asteroids. Further observations in April 1989 showed that Chiron had developed a cometary coma, A tail was detected in 1993. Chiron differs from other comets in that water is not a major component of its coma, because it is too far from the Sun for water to sublimate. In 1995 carbon monoxide was detected in Chiron in very small amounts, and the derived CO production rate was calculated to be sufficient to account for the observed coma. Cyanide was also detected in the spectrum of Chiron in 1991. At the time of its discovery, Chiron was close to aphelion, whereas the observations showing a coma were done closer to perihelion, perhaps explaining why no cometary behavior had been seen earlier. The fact that Chiron is still active probably means it has not been in its current orbit very long.

Chiron is officially designated as both a comet—95P/Chiron—and a minor planet, an indication of the sometimes fuzzy dividing line between the two classes of object. The term proto-comet has also been used. Being about 220 km in diameter, it is unusually large for a comet nucleus. Chiron was the first member of a new family of Chiron-type comets (CTC) with (TJupiter > 3; a > aJupiter). Other CTCs include: 39P/Oterma, 165P/LINEAR, 166P/NEAT, and 167P/CINEOS. There are also non-centaur asteroids that are simultaneously classified as comets, such as 4015 Wilson–Harrington, 7968 Elst–Pizarro, and 118401 LINEAR.

Since the discovery of Chiron, other centaurs have been discovered, and nearly all are currently classified as minor planets, but are being observed for possible cometary behavior. 60558 Echeclus has displayed a cometary coma and now also has the cometary designation 174P/Echeclus. After passing perihelion in early 2008, 52872 Okyrhoe significantly brightened.

Rings 

Chiron possibly has rings, similar to the better-established rings of 10199 Chariklo. Based on unexpected occultation events observed in stellar-occultation data obtained on 7 November 1993, 9 March 1994, and 29 November 2011, which were initially interpreted as resulting from jets associated with Chiron's comet-like activity, Chiron's rings are proposed to be  in radius and sharply defined. Their changing appearance at different viewing angles can largely explain the long-term variation in Chiron's brightness and hence estimates of Chiron's albedo and size. Moreover, it can, by assuming that the water ice is in Chiron's rings, explain the changing intensity of the infrared water-ice absorption bands in Chiron's spectrum, including their disappearance in 2001 (when the rings were edge-on). Also, the geometric albedo of Chiron's rings as determined by spectroscopy is consistent with that used to explain Chiron's long-term brightness variations.

The preferred pole of Chiron's rings is, in ecliptic coordinates, λ = , β = . The rings' width, separation, and optical depths are nearly identical to those of Chariklo's rings, indicating that the same type of structure is responsible for both. Moreover, both their rings are within their respective Roche limits.

Exploration 
The Chiron Orbiter Mission is a mission proposed for NASA's New Frontiers program or Flagship program. It was published in May 2010 and proposes an orbiter mission to Chiron. Its launch date could vary from as early as 2023, but as late as 2025 depending on budget and propulsion type.

There is another mission proposed apart of the Discovery Program known as Centaurus; if approved it would launch between 2026 and 2029 and make a flyby of 2060 Chiron and one other Centaur sometime in the 2030s.

Gallery

See also 
 
 List of Solar System objects by size
 Lists of small Solar System bodies

Notes

References

Further reading 

 
 Moore, Patrick; Guinness book of Astronomy, 
 SOLEX 9.1

External links 
 Orbit Fit and Astrometric record for (2060) Chiron, Marc W. Buie, SwRI – Space Science Department (2007)
 95P/Chiron at Cometography
 A single clone run of centaur 2060 Chiron showing how Chiron may someday become an active comet (Solex 10)
 
 

Centaurs (small Solar System bodies)
Chiron-type comets
002060
0095
Discoveries by Charles T. Kowal
Named minor planets
002060
002060
002060
19771018